Platymetopsis overali is a species of beetle in the family Carabidae, the only species in the genus Platymetopsis.

References

Harpalinae
Monotypic Carabidae genera